Lieutenant-General Talat Masood  (Urdu: طلعت مسعُود) is a retired three-star rank army general, a political commentator, and a mechanical engineer.

His career in the military spent in the Pakistan Army Corps of EME as an engineering officer and also served as the Federal Secretary at the Ministry of Defence Production of Government of Pakistan. He is noted for his analysis on the global national security, economic stability, and often consults on politics on the national and international media networks.

Biography 

Talat Masood was born to a noble and highly educated Urdu speaking family of Hyderabad Deccan. He joined the Pakistan Military Academy, and was educated at the Military College of Engineering where he graduated with a B.S. in mechanical engineering.

In 1951, he gained commission in the Corps of EME, where his career in the army is mostly spent. In 1951–54, 2nd-Lt. Masood was one of the few army officers who were sent to the United Kingdom to attend the Loughborough University where he did the post-graduate studies. He gained M.S. in mechanical engineering from the Loughborough University and joined the Pakistan Ordnance Factories for evaluation of fire arms and weapons accuracy.

He attended the Command and Staff College in Quetta where he qualified as a psc, and later went attended the National Defence University (NDU) where he gained MSc in defence studies.

He participated in the conflicts and wars with India in 1965 and in 1971, but his career mostly spent in the local defense production. About the aerial operations by PAF, Masood is of the view that: "The mobility, even the survivability of land forces depended to a large extent on air cover, so does the naval security. Superior air power is thus vital for any military engagement."

In 1970s, he served as the chairman of the Heavy Industries Taxila (HIT), where he was involved in the design and development of the various military vehicles and the technology evaluation of the main battle tanks.

In 1980s, he was appointed as chairman of the Pakistan Ordnance Factories (POF), where he is credited of bringing the fire-arm manufacturing organization to its peak of efficiency especially the manufacturing of the chemical explosives. In 1988–89, he was involved in the technology transfer of the Mirage III at the Pakistan Aeronautical Complex, and witnessed the induction of the aircraft to the UAE Air Force.

In 1988, Lt-Gen. Masood joined the Benazir administration when he appointed as the secretary of defense production, which he served until he retired from his military service with the army in 1990.

Post-retirement activities 
After his retirement in 1990, Masood became a political consultant to several important U.S. think tanks and technology firms.

He writes and opined regularly on political and security issues in English-language newspapers in Pakistan and foreign political correspondents. In November–December 1997, he was appointed as visiting fellow at the Stimson Center in Washington DC in the United States where his research topic included the discussion and rational on "nuclear weapons issues in the subcontinent."

Since 2013, Masood is on Council of Pugwash Conferences on World Affairs.

Awards and decorations

Notes

References
 Former South Asia Visiting Fellows (Stimson Center)

Living people
Pakistani military engineers
Pakistan Military Academy alumni
Alumni of Loughborough University
Pakistani mechanical engineers
Firearm designers
National Defence University, Pakistan alumni
Pakistani generals
Defence Secretaries of Pakistan
Government of Benazir Bhutto staffers and personnel
Pakistani civil servants
Pakistani democracy activists
Pakistani pacifists
Pakistani anti-war activists
Peace and conflict scholars
Pakistani anti–Iraq War activists
Defence and security analysts in Pakistan
Pakistani political consultants
Writers about Pakistan
1928 births